Canápolis is a Brazilian municipality located in the west of the state of Minas Gerais. Its population  was 12,201 living in a total area of 845 km². The city belongs to the statistical mesoregion of Triângulo Mineiro and Alto Paranaíba and to the statistical microregion of Uberlândia.  It became a municipality in 1948.

Canápolis is located at an elevation of 662 meters (municipal seat) in the north of the rich region known as the Triângulo Mineiro.  It is east of the Paranaíba River and south of the great hydroelectric station  and reservoir of Itumbiara.   Federal highway BR-153, which links Uberlândia with Goiânia passes at 17 kilometers east of the town.

The distance to Uberlândia is 130 km; the distance to Itumbiara is 60 km; and the distance to Belo Horizonte is 655 km.   Neighboring  municipalities are:  Centralina (N); Capinópolis (W) ; Ituiutaba (S); Monte Alegre de Minas (E) 

The main economic activities are industry, services, and agriculture, especially the growing of pineapple and sugarcane.  The GDP in 2005 was R$168,000.00, with 49,000.00 from services, 34,000.00 from industry, and 74,000.00 from agriculture.  There were 275 rural producers on 50,000 hectares of land.  133 farms had tractors.  The main crops were pineapple, bananas, sugarcane, soybeans, and corn.  There were 42,000 head of cattle (2006).

The social indicators rank it in the top tier of municipalities in the state.
Municipal Human Development Index: 0.755 (2000)
State ranking: 248 out of 853 municipalities 
National ranking: 1,728 out of 5,138 municipalities  
Literacy rate: 85%
Life expectancy: 72 (average of males and females)

The highest ranking municipality in Minas Gerais in 2000 was Poços de Caldas with 0.841, while the lowest was Setubinha with 0.568.  Nationally the highest was São Caetano do Sul in São Paulo with 0.919, while the lowest was Setubinha.  In more recent statistics (considering 5,507 municipalities) Manari in the state of Pernambuco has the lowest rating in the country—0,467—putting it in last place.

See also
 List of municipalities in Minas Gerais

References

External links
Cidade de Centralina

Municipalities in Minas Gerais